Bratřínov is a municipality and village in Prague-West District in the Central Bohemian Region of the Czech Republic. It has about 200 inhabitants.

History
The first written mention of Bratřínov is from 1100.

References

Villages in Prague-West District